Petrovci (Rusyn, Ruthenians: Петровци) is a village in eastern Croatia, in the municipality of Bogdanovci. According to the 2011 census, it had a population of 864. The majority of residents are ethnic Rusyns.

The Ruthenians originally came from Hornjica, eastern Slovakia to the Ruski Krstur around 1750, today's Serbia, and between 1830 and 1880 they came to Croatia. The Ruthenian Greek Catholic parish in Petrovci was founded in 1836 and had 1,350 believers.

See also
Pannonian Rusyns

References

Populated places in Vukovar-Syrmia County
Populated places in Syrmia
Pannonian Rusyns